Al-Muzahimiyyah Club  is a Saudi Arabian football (soccer) team in Al-Muzahimiyyah city playing at the Saudi Fourth Division.

Stadium

References

Muzahimiyyah